Global workspace theory (GWT) is a simple cognitive architecture that has been developed to account qualitatively for a large set of matched pairs of conscious and unconscious processes. It was proposed by Bernard Baars (1988, 1997, 2002). Brain interpretations and computational simulations of GWT are the focus of current research.

GWT resembles the concept of working memory, and is proposed to correspond to a "momentarily active, subjectively experienced" event in working memory (WM)—the "inner domain in which we can rehearse telephone numbers to ourselves or in which we carry on the narrative of our lives. It is usually thought to include inner speech and visual imagery." (in Baars, 1997).

The theater metaphor 
GWT can be explained in terms of a "theater metaphor". In the "theater of consciousness" a "spotlight of selective attention" shines a bright spot on stage. The bright spot reveals the contents of consciousness, actors moving in and out, making speeches or interacting with each other. The audience is not lit up—it is in the dark (i.e., unconscious) watching the play. Behind the scenes, also in the dark, are the director (executive processes), stage hands, script writers, scene designers and the like. They shape the visible activities in the bright spot, but are themselves invisible. Baars argues that this is distinct from the concept of the Cartesian theater, since it is not based on the implicit dualistic assumption of "someone" viewing the theater, and is not located in a single place in the mind (in Blackmore, 2005).

The model 
GWT involves a fleeting memory with a duration of a few seconds (much shorter than the 10–30 seconds of classical working memory). GWT contents are proposed to correspond to what we are conscious of, and are broadcast to a  multitude of unconscious cognitive brain processes, which may be called receiving processes. Other unconscious processes, operating in parallel with limited communication between them, can form coalitions which can act as input processes to the global workspace. Since globally broadcast messages can evoke actions in receiving processes throughout the brain, the global workspace may be used to exercise executive control to perform voluntary actions.  Individual as well as allied processes compete for access to the global workspace, striving to disseminate their messages to all other processes in an effort to recruit more cohorts and thereby increase the likelihood of achieving their goals. Incoming stimuli need to be stored temporarily in order to be able to compete for attention and conscious access. Kouider and Dehaene predicted the existence of a sensory memory buffer that maintains stimuli for "a few hundreds of milliseconds." Recent research offers preliminary evidence for such a buffer store and indicates a gradual but rapid decay with extraction of meaningful information severely impaired after 300 ms and most data being completely lost after 700 ms.

Baars (1997) suggests that the global workspace "is closely related to conscious experience, though not identical to it." Conscious events may involve more necessary conditions, such as interacting with a "self" system, and an executive interpreter in the brain, such as has been suggested by a number of authors including Michael S. Gazzaniga.

Nevertheless, GWT can successfully model a number of  characteristics of consciousness, such as its role in handling novel situations, its limited capacity, its sequential nature, and its ability to trigger a vast range of unconscious brain processes. Moreover, GWT lends itself well to computational modeling. Stan Franklin's IDA model is one such computational implementation of GWT. See also Dehaene et al. (2003), Shanahan (2006) and Bao (2020).

GWT also specifies "behind the scenes" contextual systems, which shape conscious contents without ever becoming conscious, such as the dorsal cortical stream of the visual system. This architectural approach leads to specific neural hypotheses. Sensory events in different modalities may compete with each other for consciousness if their contents are incompatible. For example, the audio and video track of a movie will compete rather than fuse if the two tracks are out of sync by more than 100 ms., approximately. The 100 ms  time domain corresponds closely with the known brain physiology of consciousness, including brain rhythms in the alpha-theta-gamma domain, and event-related potentials in the 200-300 ms domain.

However, much of this research is based on studies of unconscious priming and recent studies show that many of the methods used for unconscious priming are flawed

Global neuronal workspace 

Stanislas Dehaene extended the global workspace with the "neuronal avalanche" showing how sensory information gets selected to be broadcast throughout the cortex. Many brain regions, the prefrontal cortex, anterior temporal lobe, inferior parietal lobe, and the precuneus all send and receive numerous projections to and from a broad variety of distant brain regions, allowing the neurons there to integrate information over space and time. Multiple sensory modules can therefore converge onto a single coherent interpretation, for example, a "red sports car zooming by". This global interpretation is broadcast back to the global workspace creating the conditions for the emergence of a single state of consciousness, at once differentiated and integrated.

Alternatively, the theory of practopoiesis suggests that the global workspace is achieved in the brain primarily through fast adaptive mechanisms of nerve cells. According to that theory, connectivity does not matter much. Critical is rather the fact that neurons can rapidly adapt to the sensory context within which they operate. Notably, for achieving a global workspace, the theory presumes that these fast adaptive mechanisms have the capability to learn when and how to adapt.

Criticism 
Susan Blackmore challenged the concept of stream of consciousness. "When I say that consciousness is an illusion I do not mean that consciousness does not exist. I mean that consciousness is not what it appears to be. If it seems to be a continuous stream of rich and detailed experiences, happening one after the other to a conscious person, this is the illusion." However, she also says that a good way to observe the "stream of consciousness" may be to calm the mind in meditation. The criticism is based on the stream of perception data from the senses rather than about consciousness itself. Also, it is not explained why some things are conscious at all. Suggestions have also been made regarding the importance of separating "two levels of analyses" when attempting to understand the "stream of consciousness".

Baars is in agreement with these points. The continuity of the "stream of consciousness" may in fact be illusory, just as the continuity of a movie is illusory. Nevertheless, the seriality of mutually incompatible conscious events is well supported by objective research over some two centuries of experimental work. A simple illustration would be to try to be conscious of two interpretations of an ambiguous figure or word at the same time. When timing is precisely controlled, as in the case of the audio and video tracks of the same movie, seriality appears to be compulsory for potentially conscious events presented within the same 100 ms interval.

J. W. Dalton has criticized the global workspace theory on the grounds that it provides, at best, an account of the cognitive function of consciousness, and fails even to address the deeper problem of its nature, of what consciousness is, and of how any mental process whatsoever can be conscious: the so-called "hard problem of consciousness". A. C. Elitzur has argued, however, "While this hypothesis does not address the 'hard problem', namely, the very nature of consciousness, it constrains any theory that attempts to do so and provides important insights into the relation between consciousness and cognition.", as much as any consciousness theory is constrained by the natural brain perception limitations.

New work by Richard Robinson shows promise in establishing the brain functions involved in this model and may help shed light on how we understand signs or symbols and  reference these to our semiotic registers.

See also 
 Artificial consciousness
 Cognitive map
 Cognitive model
 Conceptual space
 Image schema
 LIDA (cognitive architecture)
 Multiple drafts model of consciousness
 Neural correlates of consciousness
 Sparse distributed memory

References 

 Baars, Bernard J. (1988), A Cognitive Theory of Consciousness (Cambridge, MA: Cambridge University Press)
 Baars, Bernard J.(1997), In the Theater of Consciousness (New York, NY: Oxford University Press)
 Baars, Bernard J. (2002) The conscious access hypothesis: Origins and recent evidence. Trends in Cognitive Sciences, 6 (1), 47-52.
 Blackmore, Susan (2002). There is no stream of consciousness. Journal of Consciousness Studies 9. 5-6
 Blackmore, Susan (2004). Why Global Workspace Theory cannot explain consciousness(2004) Presentation.
 Blackmore, Susan (2005). Conversations on consciousness (Oxford : Oxford University Press)
 Damasio, A.R. (1989). Time-locked multiregional retroactivation: A systems-level proposal for the neural substrates of recall and recognition. Cognition 33. 1-2:25-62.
 Dehaene, S., Sergent, C. and Changeux, J.-P. (2003). A neuronal network model linking subjective reports and objective physiological data during conscious perception. Proc. National Academy of Science (USA) 100. 14: 8520-8525.
 Metzinger, T. (ed) (2000). Neural Correlates of Consciousness: Empirical and Conceptual Questions.  MIT Press.
 Shanahan, M.P. (2006). A cognitive architecture that combines internal simulation with a global workspace. Consciousness and Cognition 15: 433-449.
 Bao, C., Fountas, Z., Olugbade, T. and Bianchi-Berthouze, N. (2020). Multimodal Data Fusion based on the Global Workspace Theory. arXiv preprint arXiv:2001.09485.

Further reading

External links 
Continuous updates on Global Workspace Theory by Baars and colleagues and published articles for download
Synopsis by Baars and Katherine McGovern
Review of Bernard Baars' A Cognitive Theory of Consciousness
Robinson R (2009) Exploring the "Global Workspace" of Consciousness

Consciousness studies
Psychological theories